Meenakshi Jain is an Indian political scientist and historian who served as an associate professor of history at Gargi College, Delhi. In 2014, she was nominated as a member of the Indian Council of Historical Research by the Government of India. In 2020, she was conferred with the Padma Shri, India's fourth highest civilian award, for her work in the field of literature and education.

Jain wrote Sati: Evangelicals, Baptist Missionaries, and the Changing Colonial Discourse on the practice of Sati in colonial India and had also authored a school history textbook, Medieval India, for NCERT, which replaced a previous textbook co-authored by Romila Thapar, Satish Chandra et al.

Early life and education 
Meenakshi Jain is the daughter of journalist Girilal Jain, a former editor of The Times of India. She received her Ph.D. in political science from the University of Delhi. Her thesis on the social base and relations between caste and politics was published in 1991.

Career 
Jain is an associate professor of history at Gargi College, affiliated to the University of Delhi. In December 2014, she was nominated as a member of the Indian Council of Historical Research by the Indian government.

Reception

Martha Nussbaum 

Writing in The Clash Within: Democracy, Religious Violence, and India's Future (2007), distinguished philosopher Martha Nussbaum noted Jain to be an amateur historian, who was trained as a sociologist and was yet to publish any significant work but was inducted into the ranks of a historian to fulfill a political mission. Recalling an interview, wherein she asked Jain about historiographic uncertainties faced whilst writing Medieval India, Nussbaum noted her to have a strongly dogmatic persona who entirely lacked in any puzzlement or a sense of difficulty—two desirable traits in a good scholar.

Nussbaum found Jain's Medieval India to poorly represent the complexity of the medieval period—a simple ideologically-based uni-dimensional war-narrative between the forces of good and evil, that did not highlight the tensions and internal conflicts between seemingly homogeneous groups. Yet she found her work to be a small "oasis of intelligence", subtlety and literacy, when contrasted with other publications of the NCERT series.

She similarly faulted and criticized multiple aspects of Jain's review of Romila Thapar's Somanatha: Many Voices of a History and noted that the heavy dose of "dogmatic ideology" contained in it, made her serious points less convincing.

Nussbaum noted that Jain's rebut to the criticisms of her works (by various leading scholars) had integrity. Whilst she often skipped the broader issues, Jain admitted to some of her errors and often produced secondary scholarly source(s) that had supported her writing, though the merit of the latter as an argument was debatable. She concluded that whilst Jain remained intellectually ahead of other right-wing historians and had genuine scholarly passions, she was inserted into the wrong domain by political forces and was compelled to produce a sub-standard work in a short time span.

Others
Sociologist Nandini Sundar noted that the exactions of the Sultanate rulers and the Mughals were portrayed from an anti-Hindu perspective in Jain's Medieval India whilst their legacy contributions to the society, culture and polity were ignored. She saw this as part of a broader pattern of state-induced historical negationism to suit the need of Rashtriya Swayamsevak Sangh. John Stratton Hawley of Columbia University found the book going against the grain in its treatment of the Bhakti movement in that she presented the movement as a response to Shankaracharya's monism rather than to the egalitarian message of Islam.

Professor Pralay Kanungo, of Jawaharlal Nehru University, noted Jain's Rama and Ayodhya as a subtle and sophisticated work that can't be outright dismissed and managed to stand apart, when contrasted with the earlier propaganda attempts by Hindutva historians. He noted that a majority of the book was devoted to attacking left-leaning anti-Hindutva historians and by cherry-picking random content from random sources coupled with stray extrapolations, she had managed to produce a useful compilation but not an authentic history. Kanungo also pointed out other significant errors including her rejecting of the established scholarly consensus about the existence of multiple versions of Ramayanas et al. He also deemed Jain's Medieval India to be the sole face-saving volume in the entire NCERT history series, that was published by the newly elected NDA government. M. V. Kamath admired of the work as a fair history, which successfully challenged the ignorance espoused by "secular intellectuals" and "Jawaharlal Nehru University historians" on the locus.

A review over the Indian Historical Review praised Sati: Evangelicals, Baptist Missionaries, and the Changing Colonial Discourse as a well-researched and cogent magnum opus, that was thoroughly packed with facts, analysis and sources. Another review over Studies in World Christianity was positive as well.

Professor Abhinav Prakash, of the University of Delhi, noted Flight of Deities and Rebirth of Temples: Episodes from Indian History to be a brilliant work.

Works

Books
 Congress Party, 1967-77: Role of Caste in Indian Politics (Vikas, 1991), .
 Medieval India: A Textbook for Class XI (NCERT, 2002), .
 Rajah-Moonje Pact: Documents On A Forgotten Chapter Of Indian History (with Devendra Svarupa, Low Price Publishers, 2007), .
 Parallel Pathways: Essays on Hindu-Muslim Relations, 1707-1857 (Konark Publishers, 2010), .
 The India They Saw (co-edited with Sandhya Jain, 4 Volumes, Prabhat Prakashan), .
 Rama and Ayodhya (Aryan Books International, 2013), .
 Sati: Evangelicals, Baptist Missionaries, and the Changing Colonial Discourse (Aryan Books International, 2016), 
 The Battle for Rama: Case of the Temple at Ayodhya (Aryan Books International, 2017), .
 "Flight of Deities and Rebirth of Temples: Episodes from Indian History" (Aryan Books International, 2019), .

Selected articles
 "Congress 1967: Strategies of Mobilisation in D. A. Low" in The Indian National Congress Centenary Hindsights, 1988.
 "Backward Castes and Social Change in U. P. and Bihar" in Srinivas, Caste: Its 20th Century Avatar (2000).
 A review of Romila Thapar's Somanatha: Many Voices of a History over The Pioneer (India).

See also
 Jadunath Sarkar
 R. C. Majumdar
 Sita Ram Goel

References 

20th-century Indian historians
Historians of India
Hindu revivalist writers
Delhi University alumni
Living people
Analysts of Ayodhya dispute
20th-century Indian women scientists
20th-century Indian scientists
Indian women science writers
Indian political writers
Writers from Delhi
20th-century Indian women writers
20th-century Indian writers
Women writers from Delhi
Year of birth missing (living people)
Recipients of the Padma Shri in literature & education